George W. Forrest (1838 – May 11, 1909) was a farmer and political figure. He represented Cumberland County in the Nova Scotia House of Assembly from 1890 to 1894 as a Liberal-Conservative member.

He was born in River Herbert, Cumberland County, Nova Scotia, of Irish descent, and was educated in Amherst. Forrest served as a captain in the militia and as a member of the Municipal Council. He was a valuator for the Intercolonial Railway.

Forrest died on May 11, 1909 in Amherst Point, Nova Scotia.

References 
The Canadian parliamentary companion, 1891 JA Gemmill

1838 births
1909 deaths
Progressive Conservative Association of Nova Scotia MLAs